Operation: Outer Space is a science fiction novel by American writer Murray Leinster. It was first published in 1954 by Fantasy Press in an edition of 2,042 copies.

Plot introduction
The novel concerns the first interstellar flight, financed by making it into a television show.

Reception
Galaxy reviewer Groff Conklin praised the novel as "a fast-paced, sardonic job that is primarily a satire on the future of mass communications." Anthony Boucher similarly praised the novel's satirical elements, although he found that "a slight lack of genuine bite and emotion" kept the novel "from being a front-ranker." P. Schuyler Miller reported that "It's no classic, but it's good reading."

References

Sources

External links
 
 

1954 American novels
1954 science fiction novels
American science fiction novels
Space exploration novels
Novels by Murray Leinster
Fantasy Press books